Buenavista High School, formerly known as Buenavista Barangay high school, was founded in 1972 a project of late President Ferdinand Marcos in Tarlac Province, Central Luzon, in the Philippines.

References

High schools in Tarlac
Educational institutions established in 1972
1972 establishments in the Philippines